Rupert of Hentzau is a 1964 British television series based on the 1898  novel Rupert of Hentzau, which ran for six half-hour episodes. It starred George Baker, Barbara Shelley, Peter Wyngarde, John Phillips, Tristram Jellinek, Sally Home and Derek Blomfield. It was recorded at the BBC Television Centre in Wood Lane, west London. All six episodes are listed as being lost.

Synopsis
Three years after the events of the Prisoner of Zenda, Queen Flavia writes to her true love, an Englishman named Rudolf Rassendyll. The letter is intercepted by Rupert of Hentzau, an out-of-favour aristocrat, who sees a chance of re-establishing himself at court by bringing news of the letter to the Ruritanian King.

Rassendyll is forced to travel to Ruritania to help the Queen, and is then forced to take the place of the King once more following his assassination.

Episodes
 "The Queen's Goodbye": 19 April 1964
 "Return to Zenda": 26 April 1964
 "Audience with the King": 3 May 1964
 "The Wheel of Chance": 10 May 1964
 "A Perilous Reunion": 17 May 1964
 "The Decision of Fate": 24 May 1964

Cast

Theme music
Scherzo of Anton Bruckner's 7th symphony

References

External links
 

BBC television dramas
Lost BBC episodes
Television shows based on British novels
Films based on works by Anthony Hope
Films set in Europe